≈

Alocasia sarawakensis is a species of flowering plant in the elephant ear genus Alocasia (family Araceae), native to Borneo. Unusually for an aroid, it is a freshwater swamp forest obligate, preferring well-lit situations. A large species, it can reach . A cultivar, 'Yucatan Princess', is commercially available.

Alocasia sarawakensis can be difficult for home gardeners in Europe or North America to grow; it will not tolerate extended periods of temperatures below 50F. During its growing season, moderate watering paired with weekly feeding of are required for Alocasia sarawakensis to thrive.

References

sarawakensis
House plants
Endemic flora of Borneo
Plants described in 1967